is jidaigeki novel written by Shōtarō Ikenami. The novel deals with the Sanada clan during the Warring States period in Japan The stories were originally serialized as a serial in the Japanese magazine Shūkan Asahi between 1974 and 1982. The novel was adapted into a television series in 1985 and a manga series.

Shōtarō Ikenami Sanada Taiheiki Museum was opened in Ueda, Nagano in 1998.

Adaptation
 Sanada Taiheiki (1985)

References

Fictional samurai
Japanese novels
Japanese historical novels
Samurai in anime and manga
Television shows based on Japanese novels
Historical anime and manga
Cultural depictions of Sanada clan
Japanese war novels